German submarine U-478 was a Type VIIC U-boat of Nazi Germany's Kriegsmarine during World War II.

She carried out one patrol. She sank no ships.

She was sunk by a Canadian and a British aircraft northeast of the Faroe Islands on 30 June 1944.

Design
German Type VIIC submarines were preceded by the shorter Type VIIB submarines. U-478 had a displacement of  when at the surface and  while submerged. She had two shafts and two  propellers.

U-478 was fitted with five  torpedo tubes (four fitted at the bow and one at the stern), fourteen torpedoes, one  SK C/35 naval gun, (220 rounds), one  Flak M42 and two twin  C/30 anti-aircraft guns. The boat had a complement of between forty-four and sixty.

Service history
The submarine was laid down on 28 October 1942 at the Deutsche Werke in Kiel as yard number 309, launched on 17 July 1943 and commissioned on 8 September under the command of Oberleutnant zur See Rudolf Rademacher.

She served with the 5th U-boat Flotilla from 8 September 1943 for training and the 3rd flotilla from 1 June 1944 for operations.

Patrol and loss
U-478s only patrol was preceded by a short trip from Kiel in Germany to Kristiansand in Norway. The patrol itself began with the boat's departure from Kristiansand on 25 June 1944.

On 30 June she was attacked and sunk by a Canadian Canso (the Canadian version of the PBY Catalina) flying boat of No. 162 Squadron RCAF and a British B-24 Liberator of No. 86 Squadron RAF northeast of the Faroe Islands.

Fifty-two men went down with U-478; there were no survivors.

References

Bibliography

External links

German Type VIIC submarines
U-boats commissioned in 1943
U-boats sunk in 1944
U-boats sunk by depth charges
U-boats sunk by British aircraft
U-boats sunk by Canadian aircraft
1943 ships
Ships built in Kiel
Ships lost with all hands
World War II submarines of Germany
World War II shipwrecks in the Norwegian Sea
Maritime incidents in June 1944